Florida's 11th House District elects one member of the Florida House of Representatives. The district representative seat is currently held by Sam Garrison since the 2022 United States House of Representatives elections. Following the 2020 United States redistricting cycle, Florida redrew district borders, changing its location from Northeast Jacksonville to Southeast Jacksonville, west of Fruit Cove, containing Middleburg. As of the 2010 Census, the district's population is 177,922.

This district features a large military presence, serving as a bedroom community for the various naval bases in Jacksonville, as well as Naval Submarine Base Kings Bay in nearby St. Marys, Georgia. This district contains Naval Station Mayport, located in Mayport, and the Blount Island Command, located on Blount Island.

There was a vacancy between November 22, 1988 and January 18, 1989 as the incumbent, Gene Hodges, resigned after being appointed to the Florida Parole Commission. Army veteran Allen Boyd won a special election to fill the seat.

There was a vacancy between September 1, 1998 and November 4, 1998 as the incumbent, Randy Mackey, resigned after being convicted of federal tax evasion. The seat remained vacant until the general election a few months later.

There is a vacancy since May 16, 2022 as the incumbent, Cord Byrd, resigned after being chosen by Governor Ron DeSantis to become the 31st secretary of state of Florida. There is an upcoming primary election on August 23, 2022, and a general election on November 8, 2022.

Donald L. Tucker served as speaker of the Florida House of Representatives from 1974 to 1978.

Representatives from 1967 to the present

See also 

 Florida's 4th Senate district
 Florida's 6th Senate district
 Florida's 4th congressional district

References 

11
Nassau County, Florida
Duval County, Florida
Jacksonville, Florida